Statistics of Ekstraklasa for the 1957 season.

Overview
12 teams competed in the 1957 Ekstraklasa. Górnik Zabrze won the championship.

League table

Results

Top goalscorers

References
Poland – List of final tables at RSSSF 

Ekstraklasa seasons
1
Pol
Pol